A génoise (usually spelled genoise in English), also known as Genoese cake or Genovese cake, is an Italian sponge cake named after the city of Genoa and associated with Italian and French cuisine. Instead of using chemical leavening, air is suspended in the batter during mixing to provide volume.

It is a whole-egg cake, unlike some other sponge cakes for which yolks and whites are beaten separately, such as Pão de Ló. The eggs, and sometimes extra yolks, are beaten with sugar and heated at the same time, using a bain-marie or flame, to a stage known to patissiers as the "ribbon stage". A genoise is generally a fairly lean cake, getting most of its fat from egg yolks, but some recipes also add in melted butter before baking.

Use and preparation
Genoise is a basic building block of much French pâtisserie and is used for making several different types of cake. The batter usually is baked to form a thin sheet.  An 1884 cookbook gives a simple recipe for a genoise:

When finished baking, the sheet is rolled while still warm (to make jelly rolls or bûches de Noël), or cut and stacked into multiple layers or line a mold to be filled with a frozen dessert.  A variety of fillings are used, such as jelly, chocolate, fruit, pastry cream, and whipped cream.  The genoise can be piped in strips to make ladyfingers or into molds to make madeleines. It is the base for Jaffa Cakes.

The cake is notable for its elastic and somewhat dry texture and is sometimes soaked with flavored syrups or liqueurs and often served with a buttercream frosting. The popular tiramisu cake may be made with ladyfingers or a genoise sheet.

A chocolate genoise can be made by substituting cocoa powder for some of the flour, and is sometimes used as a substitute for the richer cake used in the standard Sacher torte recipe.

See also
 Castella
 Chiffon cake
 Genoa cake
 Lamington
 Zuppa Inglese
 Gâteau magique
 Cuisine of Liguria
 List of Italian dishes

References

Further reading
Child, Julia, Julia's Kitchen Wisdom. New York, Knopf, 2000, .
Child, Julia and Simone Beck, Mastering the Art of French Cooking, volume 2. New York, Knopf, 1970.
Editors of Cook's Illustrated, Baking Illustrated. Brookline, MA, America's Test Kitchen, 2004, .
Editors of Domus magazine, The Silver Spoon (US English translation). New York/London, Phaidon Press, 2005, .
Roden, Claudia, The Book of Jewish Food. New York, Knopf, 1997, 

Italian desserts
French cakes
Italian cakes
Sponge cakes
Cuisine of Liguria